Leonard James "Len" Mills (8 February 1898 – 16 May 1965) was an Australian rules footballer who played with West Torrens in the South Australian National Football League (SANFL) and St Kilda and Hawthorn in the Victorian Football League (VFL).

Mills lied about his age and enlisted to serve in 1915 aged 16 years and nine months. He served in France and returned to Australia in 1919.

Mills, at 203 cm, is believed to have been at the time, the tallest ever VFL player. He was a member of the 1924 West Torrens premiership team and counts games in that's years Hobart Carnival amongst his six interstate appearances.

He played with New Town, a Tasmanian club, in 1926. The next two seasons were spent back at West Torrens.

Already 31 by the time he joined St Kilda in 1929, Mills kicked three goals on his VFL debut, against Fitzroy at Junction Oval. The following season he kicked 17 goals from eight appearances for Hawthorn, which was enough to finish second in the club's goal-kicking behind Bert Hyde.

References

1898 births
Australian rules footballers from South Australia
St Kilda Football Club players
Hawthorn Football Club players
West Torrens Football Club players
Glenorchy Football Club players
1965 deaths